The Goose Egg Formation is a geologic formation in Wyoming. It preserves fossils dating back to the Permian period.

See also

 List of fossiliferous stratigraphic units in Wyoming
 Paleontology in Wyoming

References
 

Geologic formations of Wyoming
Permian System of North America